Najjar Kola-ye Qadim (also Romanized as Najjār Kolā-ye Qadīm; also known as Najjār Kolā) is a village in Talarpey Rural District, in the Central District of Simorgh County, Mazandaran Province, Iran. At the 2006 census, its population was 697, in 196 families.

References 

Populated places in Simorgh County